Royal Naval Dockyard, Halifax was a Royal Navy base in Halifax, Nova Scotia. Established in 1759, the Halifax Yard served as the headquarters for the Royal Navy's North American Station for sixty years, starting with the Seven Years' War. The Royal Navy continued to operate the station until it was closed in 1905. The station was sold to Canada in 1907 becoming Her Majesty's Canadian Dockyard, a function it still serves today as part of CFB Halifax.

History
Halifax Harbour had served as a Royal Navy seasonal base from the founding of the city in 1749, using temporary facilities and a careening beach on Georges Island. The British purchased the property which now contains the Fleet Maintenance Facility Cape Scott for the Naval Yard. This property had belonged to John Gorham (Gorham Point), Captain Ephraim Cook, Philip Durell, Joseph Gerrish and William Nesbitt. (In the summer of 1751, Gorham built the first registered vessel in Halifax, a brig he named Osborn Galley at Gorham Point.) Land and buildings for a permanent Naval Yard were purchased in 1758 and the Yard was officially commissioned in 1759. The Yard served as the main base for the Royal Navy in North America during the Seven Years' War, the American Revolution, the French Revolutionary Wars and the War of 1812.

In 1818 Halifax became the summer base for the squadron which shifted to the Royal Naval Dockyard, Bermuda for the remainder of the year. The Halifax yard did not have a dry dock until 1887 so it was officially called the "Halifax Naval Yard" when first established, although it was popularly known as the Halifax Dockyard. The graving dock, coaling facilities and torpedo boat slip were added between 1881 and 1897. The station closed in 1905 and sold to Canada in 1907 becoming Her Majesty's Canadian Dockyard, a function it still serves today as part of CFB Halifax.

The Yard was located on the western shores of Halifax Harbour to the north of Citadel Hill and the main Halifax townsite. In addition to refitting and supplying the North American Squadron the Halifax Yard played a vital role in supplying masts and spars for the entire Royal Navy after the loss of the timber resources in the American colonies in the American Revolution. Masts cut all over British North America were collected and stored in Halifax to be shipped to British Dockyards in wartime with heavily escorted mast convoys.

The site was designated a National Historic Site of Canada in 1923.

Facilities

The Naval Yard was initially defended by its own large blockhouse, three redoubts and a fortified stone wall. These defences were enhanced and later replaced by the large network of army fortifications whose main purposes was to safeguard the Naval Dockyard including nearby Fort Needham, Fort George, the Halifax Citadel; York Redoubt; Fort Charlotte on Georges Island, Fort Clarence in Dartmouth; five forts on McNabs Island and extensive batteries at Point Pleasant.

Many of the original Royal Navy 18th and 19th century buildings in the Dockyard were destroyed in the 1917 Halifax Explosion; others were demolished in World War II to make way for machine shops, stores buildings and drill halls needed to man and maintain the many escort ships being commissioned during the crash expansion of the Royal Canadian Navy during the Battle of the Atlantic. Only one residence from 1814 and the Admiral's Residence from 1816 survived. The Admiral's residence in now the Maritime Command Museum. The original Naval Yard clock has been restored and moved to the Halifax Ferry Terminal entrance while the original Naval Yard bell is preserved at the Maritime Museum of the Atlantic in Halifax, a museum which also features a large diorama depicting the Naval Yard in 1813 at its height in the Age of Sail.

The building and facilities in the base included:
 careening wharf
 mast ponds and mast house
 boat house
 refitting yard
 building slip
 astronomical observatory
 commissioner's residence
 graving yard (after 1887)
 coal facility
 torpedo boat yard
 Wardroom
 victualling yard (North Dockyard)
 Gate Warder's House
 Commissioner's House
 Hospital – home to Royal Naval College of Canada from 1911 to 1917
 Admiralty House – home to the Admiral of the North American Station and now Maritime Command Museum

Ships

The main purpose of the Halifax Yard was to supply, man and refit ships but it also built some warships including:
 
 

Ships based at the Royal Navy Yard Halifax included:

Administration of the dockyard and other key officials
The Master Shipwright was originally the key civil official at the royal navy dockyards during the 16th century until the Navy Board introduced resident commissioners of the navy in the 17th century, after which he became deputy to the resident commissioner. In 1832 the post of commissioner was replaced by the post of superintendent, who was retained the same powers and authority as the former commissioners. In September 1971 all flag officers of the Royal Navy holding positions of Admiral Superintendents at Royal Dockyards were restyled as Port Admirals.

Resident Commissioner of the Navy, Halifax Nova Scotia
Incomplete list of post holders included:
 1775–1778, Captain Marriott Arbuthnot
 1778–1781, Captain Sir Richard Hughes
 1781–1783, Captain Andrew Snape Hamond
 1783–1799, Captain Henry Duncan
 1799–1800, Captain Isaac Coffin
 1800–1803, Captain Henry Duncan
 1803–1812, Captain John Nicholson Inglefield
 1812–1819, Captain Philip Wodehouse

Master Shipwright, Halifax Dockyard
Incomplete list of post holders included:
 1756–1762, George Kittoe (originally appointed as acting master shipwright)
 1763–1770, Abraham Constable 
 1783–1792 Provo Featherstone Wallis, father of Provo Wallis 
 1813–1818, Thomas Forder Hawkes
 1818–1839, Algernon Frederick Jones

Note: (post holders were appointed until 1875)

Master Attendant, Halifax Dockyard
Incomplete list of post holders included:

 1758, Richard Hamilton 
 1763, David Hooper
 1780–1787, Samuel Hemmens 
 1788–1799, Thomas Read 
 1799–1802, John Jackson 
 1806, John Parry
 1807–1810, Thomas Atkinson
 1815–1827, John Douglas

Storekeeper, Halifax Dockyard
Incomplete list of post holders included:
 1756-1773/, Joseph Gerrish (superannuated)
 1773–1780, Richard Williams (resigned March 1780)
 1780, Mar–Aug, John Gambier
 1780, George Thomas
 1790–1799, Titus Livie 
 1832–1840, John Robert Glover
 1841–1852, Alex Elliot

Naval Storekeeper, Halifax Dockyard
Title changed in 1853
 1853–1854, Alex Elliot
 1855–1858, Edgecumbe Chevallier
 1858–1859, John N. Macgregor

Naval Storekeeper and Agent Victualler, Halifax Dockyard
Additional title and responsibility added in 1859
 1859, John N. Macgregor

Officers-in-Charge, Royal Naval Hospital Halifax 

 1795–1803 Duncan Clark (surgeon) 
 1803–1806 John Jackson
1807–1808 David Ridgway
1811–1812 John Clifford ( – 31 Dec. 1812)
1813–1819 David Rowlands (surgeon) (Rowland), F.R.S. (1778, Cardigan, Ceredigion – 13 January 1846, London) Inspector of H.M. Hospitals and Fleets – surgeon on ship Royal William; monument to his wife at St. Paul's Church (Halifax); tended to the wounded of HMS Shannon, including Captain Philip Broke; monument to him and another to his sister in Parish Church of St Mary where they were buried</ref>
1819–1827 David Ridgway
1828–1837 J.H. McEwan
1841–1855 Alexander Elliott
1855–1859 Edgecombe (Edgecumbe) Chevallier
1860–1866 J.N. MacGregor
1867–1880 Benjamin Stokes
1881–1899 Andrew Vizard (1841-27 Oct 1922)
1900–1901 Nathaniel A. Hay
1901–1904 Henry Baker
1904–1905 A.C. Cocks

See also
 George Benson Hall
 History of the Halifax Regional Municipality
 Military history of Nova Scotia
 Port of Halifax

References

Sources
 Brent Raymond, "Tracing the Built Form of HMC Dockyard", Nova Scotia Museum, 1999. Curatorial Report No. 88
 Clowes, Sir William Laird (1897–1903). The royal navy, a history from the earliest times to the present Volume III. London, England: S. Low Marston. 
 Clowes, Sir William Laird (1897–1903). The royal navy, a history from the earliest times to the present Volume IV. London, England: S. Low Marston. 
 Clowes, Sir William Laird (1897–1903). The royal navy, a history from the earliest times to the present Volume V. London, England: S. Low Marston.
 George Bates. John Gorham 1709–1751. Collections of the Nova Scotia Historical Society.
 Gwyn, Julian, (2004). Frigates and Foremasts: The North American Squadron in Nova Scotia Waters, 1745–1815 Vancouver, BC: UBC Press . OCLC 144078613.
 Harrison, Simon (2010–2018). "Master Attendant at Halifax Dockyard". threedecks.org. S. Harrison.
 Harrison, Simon (2010–2018). "Master Shipwright at Halifax Dockyard". threedecks.org. S. Harrison.
 Harrison, Simon (2010–2018). "Storekeeper at Halifax Dockyard". threedecks.org. S. Harrison.
 Marilyn Gurney, The Kings Yard, Maritime Command Museum, Halifax.
 Research guide B5: Royal Naval Dockyards
 CFB Halifax Officers Mess
.

External links

Military of Canada
Royal Navy bases in Canada
History of Halifax, Nova Scotia
Naval history of Canada
Royal Navy dockyards in Canada
Royal Canadian Navy dockyards